Vladimir Karajayevich Bayramov or Wladimir Karajaýewiç Baýramow (born 2 August 1980) is a former football player who last played as a centre forward for Nebitçi FT and Turkmenistan. He also holds Russian citizenship.

Biography
Vladimir was born in Ashgabat. He began playing football aged 8 under . He is a graduate of high school №39 in Ashgabat.

He studied coaching at the Institute of Sports and Tourism of Turkmenistan.

In 2001, he married, his wife Jemma, a banker.

His younger brother Nazar Bayramov is a professional footballer.

Career
Professional football career began at age 17, in 1997–1999 played for Köpetdag Aşgabat.

Then he moved to Kazakhstan. 1999–2000 season played for teams Zhenis Astana and Access Petropavlovsk.

The second half of the 2001 season held in Russian FC Kristall Smolensk.

In 2002, rented FC Metallurg Krasnoyarsk for the year.

The new season started in FC Rubin Kazan. He failed to gain a foothold in the first team of FC Rubin Kazan, in his first season in the Kazan club mostly played in the doubles tournament, which has scored a few goals. Total in his debut season in the Premier League spent 1 match.

In the summer of 2003, he joined to FC Terek on loan until the end of the 2003 season. For FC Terek debut in a match with the FC Baltika Kaliningrad, coming on as a second-half substitute, FC Terek won 1–0. For the club Bayramov held 20 official matches in the Championship of Russia, scoring 8 goals. As part of FC Terek won the Russian Cup 2003/2004.

In December 2007 Bayramov signed a long-term contract (3 years) from the Moscow Region club FC Khimki. For the club Bayramov spent 15 official matches in the Championship of Russia and did not score any goals.

In winter 2009, FC Tobol officially announced that Vladimir Bayramov joined the club on loan. In 2009, Bayramov was the best scorer of Kazakhstan, scoring 20 goals in a season. In December 2009, became a free agent and left the FC Khimki.

In 2011 moved to FC Kairat. In July 2011, was on view in FC Khimki.

Since 2012, played for the Turkmen club FC Ahal.

Since 2013, playing for the FC Balkan. In 2013 with FC Balkan he won the AFC President's Cup 2013 in Malaysia.

Achievements
 'AFC President's Cup:' 2013

Career stats

Club

International

Statistics accurate as of match played 26 March 2013

International goals
Statistics accurate as of match played 26 March 2013
Scores and results list Turkmenistan's goal tally first.

References

External links

Profile at Fifa
http://kaz-football.kz/11/alm11.shtml

1980 births
Living people
Turkmenistan people of Russian descent
Turkmenistan footballers
Turkmenistan international footballers
Sportspeople from Ashgabat
2004 AFC Asian Cup players
FC Rubin Kazan players
FC Zhenis Astana players
FC Kyzylzhar players
FC Akhmat Grozny players
FC Ahal players
Expatriate footballers in Kazakhstan
Expatriate footballers in Russia
Russian Premier League players
Kazakhstan Premier League players
FC Khimki players
Turkmenistan emigrants to Russia
Turkmenistan expatriates in Russia
FC Tobol players
FC Kairat players
Turkmenistan expatriate sportspeople in Kazakhstan
Footballers at the 2002 Asian Games
FC Kristall Smolensk players
Association football forwards
FC Yenisey Krasnoyarsk players
Asian Games competitors for Turkmenistan